Back to school (or similar) may refer to:
 Back to School, a 1986 comedy film starring Rodney Dangerfield
 Back to School (2019 film), a French film
 “Back to School (I Am Weasel)”, an episode of the animated television series I Am Weasel
 “ Back to School”, a song by Jon and Vangelis from their album The Friends of Mr Cairo
 “Back to School (Mini Maggit)”, a song composed by the American alternative metal band Deftones
 Back to school (marketing), the period in which students purchase supplies to prepare themselves for the school year
 Back to Skool, a 1985 video game for the ZX Spectrum computer
 First day of school, the first day that school opens after a vacation